Cranford High School is a four-year public high school serving students in ninth through twelfth grades, located in Cranford, in Union County, New Jersey, United States, and operating as the lone secondary school of the Cranford Township Public Schools. The school has been accredited by the Middle States Association of Colleges and Schools Commission on Elementary and Secondary Schools since 1929.

As of the 2021–22 school year, the school had an enrollment of 1,107 students and 97.8 classroom teachers (on an FTE basis), for a student–teacher ratio of 11.3:1. There were 13 students (1.2% of enrollment) eligible for free lunch and 4 (0.4% of students) eligible for reduced-cost lunch.

The student population consists primarily of students who attended junior high school at either Orange Avenue School or Hillside Avenue School within the Cranford Township Public Schools or went to Saint Michael's School. The school is home to championship sports teams, a competitive academic program, and a large number of clubs.

History
It was founded in 1902, the present building was built in 1937, and classes began in January 1938. For several decades, the school was actually a six-year school, housing students from seventh grade to twelfth grade. In the 1970s, while the school was undergoing renovations, it was a two-year school for students in eleventh grade and twelfth grade. In 1973, the school completed the additions, and it returned to its status as a four-year school in 1979.

Academics
CHS offers over 25 Advanced Placement classes in addition to many honors and college-preparatory classes. The faculty contributes to the scholastic environment with over 40% of the staff with post-baccalaureate degrees. Recently, the school developed "The High School University of Cranford," a program that provides additional opportunities for those who wish to extend their education without having to place in the top portion of the class based on class rank formulated from GPA calculation (though it tends to best suit high-achieving students with top grades). It serves as the school's equivalent to a "gifted and talented" program.

Awards, recognition and rankings
The school was the 49th-ranked public high school in New Jersey out of 339 schools statewide in New Jersey Monthly magazine's September 2014 cover story on the state's "Top Public High Schools", using a new ranking methodology. The school had been ranked 51st in the state of 328 schools in 2012, after being ranked 13th in 2010 out of 322 schools listed (and second-highest in Union County). The magazine ranked the school 29th in the magazine's September 2008 issue and 39th in the magazine's September 2006 issue.

Schooldigger.com ranked the school tied for 47th out of 381 public high schools statewide in its 2011 rankings (an increase of 78 positions from the 2010 ranking) which were based on the combined percentage of students classified as proficient or above proficient on the mathematics (91.7%) and language arts literacy (98.2%) components of the High School Proficiency Assessment (HSPA).

In its listing of "America's Best High Schools 2016", the school was ranked 377th out of 500 best high schools in the country; it was ranked 43rd among all high schools in New Jersey and 26th among the state's non-magnet schools.

In its 2013 report on  "America's Best High Schools", The Daily Beast ranked the school 206th in the nation among participating public high schools and 15th overall (eighth of non-magnet schools) in New Jersey.

In the 2011 "Ranking America's High Schools" issue by The Washington Post, the school was ranked 12th in New Jersey and 513th nationwide. In Newsweek's June 13, 2010 issue, ranking the country's top high schools, Cranford High School was listed in 551st place, the 11th-highest ranked school in New Jersey.

For the 2002–03 school year, Cranford High School was designated as a "Star School" by the New Jersey Department of Education, the highest honor that a New Jersey school can achieve, and the school has been selected for the Best Practice Award.

In 2004, Cranford High School was recognized as a National School of Character Winner by the Character Education Partnership, one of ten schools selected nationwide for its efforts in instilling character education in its curriculum and students.

Student life

Clubs 
Cranford High School has over 70 extracurricular groups. The CHS Model United Nations team returns each year with numerous awards with many conference officers as well as one Secretary General in 1996–1997. The Youth In Government Team has also been accustomed to high achievement with a smaller contingent of members. Members of the Youth in Government Club have been successful in passing mock legislation in this annual statewide conference and in having students serve in the Cabinet. Both clubs have produced political science and international relations students at the collegiate level.

Cranford's DECA delegation also comes home from their conference(s) with numerous awards as well. In 2019, forty-six students advanced during the regional competition to participate in the state competition.

The Math League, the school's largest student club with over 300 members, holds six competitions throughout the year. CHS students have regularly placed well in New Jersey Math League competitions. The CHS Mock Trial team has been active for many years and ranks as one of the best mock trial teams in Union County. The mock trial team has won over a dozen county championship. Their newest victory was the Union County Mock Trial Finals in 2011. The CHS Forensics Team has been ranked as a top team in New Jersey and has competed in the New Jersey Catholic Forensics League and has sent several students to national competitions.

The CHS Student Government is an active presence in the school, staging a series of events during the course of the year, including food drives, spirit weeks, and community service fundraisers. The student government president and other members serve on a variety of school committees. The four class governments stage fundraisers and events throughout the year. The senior class stages an annual Pasta Night as a big final fundraiser for the school prom.

The CHS Pride program helps incoming freshmen navigate through their first year of high school. The leadership group is comprised of junior and senior students and headed by a student steering committee and teacher advisers. They host monthly outreach meetings, where the freshmen students participate in various team bonding and character building activities.

"Dialogue", the online school newspaper, features monthly student submissions on the various happenings of CHS. Readers can find information on life at CHS, athletics, arts, and multimedia, as well as opinions on various topics of debate.

In 1956 (tied with Columbia High School), the school's chess team was the New Jersey high school team champion, winning the Father Casimir J. Finley Trophy.

Athletics
The Cranford High School Cougars compete in the Union County Interscholastic Athletic Conference, which is comprised of public and private high schools in Union County and was established following a reorganization of sports leagues in Northern New Jersey by the New Jersey State Interscholastic Athletic Association (NJSIAA). Prior to the NJSIAA's 2009 realignment, the school participated in the Mountain Valley Conference. With 942 students in grades 10-12, the school was classified by the NJSIAA for the 2019–20 school year as Group III for most athletic competition purposes, which included schools with an enrollment of 761 to 1,058 students in that grade range. The football team competes in Division 4 of the Big Central Football Conference, which includes 60 public and private high schools in Hunterdon, Middlesex, Somerset, Union and Warren counties, which are broken down into 10 divisions by size and location. The school was classified by the NJSIAA as Group IV North for football for 2018–2020.

From the conference's inception until the 2005–06 school year, Cranford had been a member of the Watchung Conference. Due to the change in size of the student body and location, Cranford's decision to leave the Watchung Conference for the Mountain Valley Conference was approved in 2006 and Cranford began competition in most sports in the 2006–07 school year, remaining there until the realignment.

The track team has won county and conference championships in its two seasons of running. The cross-country team has won Union County and Watchung Conference championships over an eight-year period. The cross country and track teams have been known as some of the best teams in the school over the years, with many individual and team championships over the years. The girls track team has won state sectionals and has had two group champions in 2009.

The boys track team won the spring track state championship in Group III in 1932, won the Group II title in 1934-1936, 1946 and 1953.

The boys basketball team won the Group II state championship in 1936 (defeating runner-up Merchantville High School in the tournament final) and won the Group III title in 2002 (vs. Penns Grove High School). Down by six points at the half, the 1936 team rallied to win the Group II state title with a 36-33 win against Merchantville in the championship game played at Rutgers University.

Cranford's football team was undefeated in 1957, won the North II Group III state championship, and was ranked eighth in the state behind seven Group IV schools. The Blue-and-Gold eleven shared the sectional title with the former Clifford Scott High School of East Orange in 1952. In the playoff era, the team won the North II Group III state sectional championship in 2011 and 2015. Cranford won the North II Group III state sectional championship in 2011 defeating Parsippany Hills High School by a score of 27–0, finishing the season with a 10–1 record, its only loss coming to Summit High School. The 2015 team won the program's second North II Group III playoff title with a 50-23 win against Chatham High School in the tournament final, finishing the season with 12-0 record. Cranford High School football has been led by coach Erik Rosenmeier since 2004.

Cranford High School's baseball won the Group IV state championship in 1971 (defeating Ewing High School in the tournament final), and has won Group III in 1997 (vs. Sayreville War Memorial High School), 2010 (vs. Ocean City High School), 2012 (vs. Freehold Borough High School) and 2013 (vs. Burlington Township High School); the five state championships places the program tied for eighth-most in the state. The team won the Union County Championship in 1999, 2000, 2001, 2003, 2007, 2010, 2011, 2013 , 2015, and 2019; the team ranks second with a total of nine county tournament championships. The baseball team won the 2003 North II, Group III sectional championship, edging Millburn High School in the tournament final. The 2007 team won the North II, Group III state sectional championship, edging West Morris Central High School, by a score of 5–4. The 2010 baseball team was the first team to win all five championships possible: Conference, County, Section, North NJ, and State, including a 15–3 win over Ocean City High School for the program's third win in a Group III final, as part of a season in which the team finished with a record of 26–5. In 2012, the team outscored Freehold High School by a score of 4-1 in the Group III championship game. The 2013 team finished the season with a 25-1 record, winning the Group III title with a 4-2 win against Burlington Township High School.

The boys cross country team won the Group IV state championship in 1975, the Group III title in 2000 and won in Group II in 2004.

The boys bowling team won the overall state championship in 1982.

The field hockey team won the North II Group III state sectional championship in 1985 and 1986.

The wrestling team won the North II Group III state sectional title in 1985, 1986 and 2017.

The ice hockey team won the Handchen Cup in 1996, the Union County Cup in 2016 and the Monsignor Kelly Cup in 2020. After losing in the final game of the tournament in the previous two seasons, The team won the Kelly Cup in 2020, defeating the Glen Ridge / Verona co-op team by a score of 3–2 in the tournament final.

The girls soccer team was Group III co-champion in 2000 with Middletown High School South.

The girls volleyball team won the Group II state championship in 2008, defeating Northern Valley Regional High School at Demarest in the final match of the playoff tournament. In 2006, the team shared the Mountain Valley Conference title with Union Catholic High School and made it to the semi-finals of the Union County Tournament. The 2007 team had a record of 25–3, the girls won the conference title, and defeated Westfield High School for the first time ever in the Union County Tournament finals. They made their best state tournament appearance, losing to Northern Valley Regional High School at Demarest in three games. In the 2008 season, the team was equally successful and after losing the county tournament to Union Catholic at Union Catholic in a three games and also losing the Mountain Valley Conference to Union Catholic, the team came back to be seeded 1st in the Group II state championships and went on to capture the Group II state title over Northern Valley Regional High School at Demarest in the tournament final and advancing to the Tournament of Champions with a record of 24–4, becoming the first public school from Union County to capture a volleyball state title.

Cranford maintains a spirited rivalry with Westfield High School in sports where the two compete. Some notable games looking back a to 2010 which kept the rivalry sparked were soccer and baseball county championships. After beating Westfield earlier in the year during the regular season, Cranford defeated Westfield by a score of 1–0 in the county championship.  During the spring, the baseball team was able to knock off Westfield by a score of 6–5 in the county championship.  Cranford trailed by as much as five runs during the game and were able to rally back to defeat their rivals.

Music and drama
The Cougar Marching Band in October 2005 received new band uniforms after 30 years. The marching band performs at all of the varsity football team's games. In the fall of 2006, the Cougar Marching Band placed first at the Bloomfield Band Festival and second at a USSBA show in Plainfield. In 2008, the band attended the USSBA NJ State Band Championships for the first time. For the 2009 school year they performed "The Music of the Night" as their field show, taking first in a competition. During their 2010 Cirque De Soleil field show the band earned top honors throughout the state: 1st place and best music, visual, and overall effect at a NJ competition, 2nd place and best music at another NJ Competition, and at the state championships took 3rd best band in the state and best music of the entire state. In November 2012, the Marching Band took eighth place at the US Bands National Competition at MetLife Stadium.

The music department hosts the renowned Madrigal Choir (14-16 students) as well as the Concert Choir (40-50 students), both of which are auditioned. Also included in the music department are the open men's and women's choirs, two pop a cappella vocal groups called Noteworthy Gentlemen and Women's Ensemble, and an orchestra. Choir is an especially strong tradition at CHS and music department culture is often competitive. All music classes are given as classes and several concerts are held during the year. The winter and spring concerts are held with all choirs performing, along with the band and orchestra. A jazz band consists of several marching band performers. The Madrigals and Jazz Band perform in a variety of community settings during the course of the year.

The Concert Choir and Band travel to annual competitions around the country. The two groups, along with the Madrigals and Jazz Band, have won many national awards for their work. The choir and band trips are well known activities and fundraising for them is an annual event.

The school productions occur twice a year. The spring musical has become renowned in the past several years. The school's production of Jekyll and Hyde in 2005 won, among other categories, "Best Overall Production of a Musical" at the statewide Rising Star Award Ceremony at the Paper Mill Playhouse. The 2006 production of The Scarlet Pimpernel also won several awards. The school also received several Rising Star Award nominations in 2007 in Titanic. The annual fall production is often a comedy (i.e., The Man Who Came to Dinner, Noises Off!) with the spring being a musical production. More recent productions include Grease, Fiddler on the Roof, Sweet Charity, Oklahoma!, Bye Bye Birdie, and Into the Woods.

In popular culture
The high school was featured as the high school on Nickelodeon’s The Adventures of Pete & Pete

Notable people

Notable alumni 

 Carol Blazejowski (born 1956), General Manager, New York Liberty; Member, Basketball Hall of Fame.
 Robert Ferro (1941-1988), novelist who explored conflict of growing up gay in a loving but conservative Catholic family; he fondly recalled his CHS English teacher in a 1984 interview.
 Will Fries (born 1998), offensive guard for the Indianapolis Colts of the National Football League.
 Gary Kott (born , class of 1965), television and advertising writer, who was a writer and supervising producer of The Cosby Show.
 Askold Melnyczuk (born 1954), writer who founded the journal AGNI and whose novels include What Is Told, Ambassador of the Dead, House of Widows and Excerpt from Smedley's Secret Guide to World Literature.
 Nancy Salzman (born 1954), felon and the co-founder of NXIVM, a multi-level marketing company and cult.
 Henry Simon (born 1921), retired United States Air Force major general who served as deputy director of the Defense Supply Agency.
 Bernie Wagenblast (born 1956), transportation journalist and voice-over artist.
 Deborah Wolfe (1916-2004), educator, minister, and Education Chief of the United States House of Representatives Committee on Education and Labor.

Notable faculty
 Hubie Brown (born 1933), NBA basketball coach and analyst.
 Rollie Massimino (born 1934), men's college basketball coach, most notably with the Villanova Wildcats.

References

External links

Data for Cranford High School, National Center for Education Statistics

1902 establishments in New Jersey
Cranford, New Jersey
Educational institutions established in 1902
Middle States Commission on Secondary Schools
Public high schools in Union County, New Jersey